Bishopstone Cliffs is a   Local Nature Reserve in Reculver on the eastern outskirts of Herne Bay, Kent. It is owned and managed by  Canterbury City Council. It is part of Thanet Coast Site of Special Scientific Interest, and Thanet Coast and Sandwich Bay  Ramsar site and Special Protection Area.

This is a grassland site on the top of cliffs, and it has some rare insect species. Sand martins nest in holes in the cliffs, and other birds include skylarks, meadow pipits and corn buntings.

There is public access to the site, most of which is within Reculver Country Park.

References

Local Nature Reserves in Kent